Winchester is an unincorporated town and census-designated place (CDP) in Clark County, Nevada, United States that contains part of the Las Vegas Strip. It is one of a number of CDPs in the unincorporated urbanized area directly south of Las Vegas. The population was 36,403 at the 2020 census. It is governed by the Clark County Commission with advice from the Winchester Town Advisory Board. "Winchester, NV" does not appear in postal addresses; the United States Postal Service has assigned "Las Vegas, NV" as the place name for the ZIP codes containing Winchester.

History

The southern part of the Las Vegas Valley was referred to as Paradise Valley as early as 1910, owing to a high water table that made the land particularly fertile for farming. County commissioners established a Paradise school district in 1914.

In 1950, mayor Ernie Cragin of Las Vegas sought to annex the Las Vegas Strip, which was unincorporated territory, in order to expand the city's tax base to fund his ambitious building agenda and pay down the city's rising debt. A group of casino executives, led by Gus Greenbaum of the Flamingo, lobbied the county commissioners for town status, which would prevent the city from annexing the land without the commission's approval. The commission voted to create the unincorporated town of Paradise on December 8, 1950. A month after its establishment, the town was expanded to include the residential areas of Paradise Valley. Months later, however, it was reported that county officials had determined that the town had not been properly established, because the petition for the town's formation had an insufficient number of signatures and because it had violated a state law forbidding formation of a town spanning multiple school districts. On August 20, 1951, county commissioners accepted petitions to create two new towns covering the area of the putative town. Town "A" of Paradise included the areas that lay within a Las Vegas school district, extending from the city limits to a point one mile south, while Town "B" included the areas within the Paradise school district. In 1953, Town A was renamed as Winchester, and Town B became known simply as Paradise. Ultimately, in 1956 state law consolidated all local school districts into a countywide school district, which in the Las Vegas Valley's case is the Clark County School District.

Geography
Winchester sits in the east-central part of the Las Vegas Valley. To the north it borders Las Vegas, to the west and south is the CDP of Paradise, and to the east is Sunrise Manor.

Relative to streets, it is the area bordered by Sahara Avenue on the north, Boulder Highway on the east,  Desert Inn Road on the south and the Union Pacific Railroad tracks on the west, with a few additional enclaves west of Interstate 15.

Demographics

At the 2000 census there were 26,958 people, 11,986 households, and 6,052 families living in the CDP. The racial makeup of the CDP was 71.83% White, 7.03% African American, 0.87% Native American, 5.36% Asian, 0.44% Pacific Islander, 9.66% from other races, and 4.81% from two or more races. Hispanic or Latino of any race were 29.01%.

Of the 11,986 households 20.2% had children under the age of 18 living with them, 33.3% were married couples living together, 11.7% had a female householder with no husband present, and 49.5% were non-families. 38.7% of households were one person and 14.3% were one person aged 65 or older. The average household size was 2.24 and the average family size was 3.01.

The age distribution was 19.8% under the age of 18, 9.0% from 18 to 24, 29.2% from 25 to 44, 24.5% from 45 to 64, and 17.5% 65 or older. The median age was 40 years. For every 100 females, there were 106.4 males. For every 100 females age 18 and over, there were 105.7 males.

The median household income was $32,251 and the median family income  was $39,451. Males had a median income of $27,886 versus $22,453 for females. The per capita income for the CDP was $20,615. About 11.4% of families and 14.0% of the population were below the poverty line, including 19.2% of those under age 18 and 8.5% of those age 65 or over.

See also

References

External links
 Winchester Town Advisory Board Homepage

 
1951 establishments in Nevada
Census-designated places in Clark County, Nevada
Las Vegas Valley
Populated places established in 1951
Unincorporated towns in Nevada